George Nevill, de facto 13th (de jure 1st) Baron Bergavenny (c.1659 – 11 March 1720/21) was an English peer.

The son of George Nevill and Mary, daughter of the Roundhead Bulstrode Whitelocke and his second wife Frances Willoughby, he succeeded to the Barony upon the death of the 12th Baron, a distant cousin also called George.

He married Anne Walker, daughter of Captain Nehemiah Walker, on 22 October 1698, and they had the following children:
Hon. Henry Nevill (bef. 1702 – c. 1710)
George Nevill, 14th Baron Bergavenny (1702–1723)
Hon. Jane Nevill (1703–1786)
Edward Nevill, 15th Baron Bergavenny (1705–1724)
Hon. Anne Nevill (1715–1736/37)

The marriage was evidently unhappy and the couple separated in 1712. After his death Anne remarried John West, 1st Earl De La Warr. She died in 1748.

1650s births
1721 deaths
George
English landowners
Barons Bergavenny (Peerage of England)